The men's 3000 metres steeplechase at the 2015 World Championships in Athletics was held at the Beijing National Stadium on 22 and 24 August.

Summary
The Kenyan dominance of this event is well noted.  Coming off the race in Monaco, running the #3 non-Kenyan time in history even after falling over the last barrier and losing three to five seconds, Evan Jager had the confidence to run with the Kenyans at the front of the pack.  Still, three of the Kenyans in this race were ahead of him on that list.  This was a strategic race, with the Kenyan team asserting dominance in front of the pack but not running away from the field.  Non-team player, multi-defending champion Ezekiel Kemboi didn't share the lead duties, instead spending the entire first six laps on the rail about 2-3 runners behind the lead.  At the bell, Jager took the lead and tried to launch his sprint.  As the race accelerated, only the four Kenyans and Brahim Taleb were able to stay at the front.  Conseslus Kipruto and Jairus Kipchoge Birech passed Jager a step before the barrier at the beginning of the backstretch.  After landing that barrier, defending champion Kemboi took off sprinting passing Jager on the inside and his compatriots on the outside before taking the next barrier clearly in the lead.  After opening up a gap through the water jump, Conseslus came back swinging wide on the home stretch looking like he was going to run past Kemboi.  Instead Conseslus had to noticeably adjust his stride, taking the final barrier awkwardly.  Kemboi took it smoothly and sprinted home to victory, drifting out only to lane 3 this time in celebration.  Behind them, Birech took his final barrier awkwardly and Brimin Kipruto caught him for the bronze medal.	

Now 33 years old, Ezekiel Kemboi proved his illustrious career is not over.  He became the first person to win an event in the world championships four times in a row.  In addition to the four championships in a row, he took the silver medal in the three World Championships before that, silver or gold seven times in a row.  Add to that, a pair of Olympic gold medals in the same time frame.  And the scenario remains the same, the final lap backstretch burst and a Kipruto struggling over the last barrier while trying to catch up.

Records
Prior to the competition, the records were as follows:

Qualification standards

Schedule

Results

Heats
Qualification: Best 3 (Q) and next 6 fastest (q) qualify for the next round.

Final

The final was started at 21:15.

References

3000 metres steeplechase
Steeplechase at the World Athletics Championships